Bailey Rice (born 4 October 2006) is a Scottish professional association football player for Scottish Premiership side Rangers.

Club career
Rice, a product of the Motherwell youth academy, signed for Rangers on 30 June 2022 after rejecting a professional contract with the Steelmen. He made his debut for Rangers in a Scottish Premiership match away to Livingston, as an 88th minute substitute for Ryan Kent, in February 2023. This appearance made Rice the youngest post-war league player for the club, aged 16 years and 137 days, and the second youngest post-war player in all competitions, after Derek Ferguson.

International career
He has represented Scotland, playing twelve matches for the under-17s team.

Career statistics

References

External links

2006 births
Living people
Scottish footballers
Association football midfielders
Scottish Football League players
Rangers F.C. players
Motherwell F.C. players
Scotland youth international footballers
Lowland Football League players